John Skeete (16 June 1848 – July 1889) was a Barbadian cricketer. He played in one first-class match for the Barbados cricket team in 1865/66.

See also
 List of Barbadian representative cricketers

References

External links
 

1848  births
1889 deaths
Barbadian cricketers
Barbados cricketers
People from Saint Lucy, Barbados